Tetraspanin 9 is a protein that in humans is encoded by the TSPAN9 gene.

Function

The protein encoded by this gene is a member of the transmembrane 4 superfamily, also known as the tetraspanin family. Most of these members are cell-surface proteins that are characterized by the presence of four hydrophobic domains. The proteins mediate signal transduction events that play a role in the regulation of cell development, activation, growth and motility. Alternatively spliced transcripts encoding the same protein have been identified. [provided by RefSeq, Nov 2009].

References

Further reading